Arun Deshpande is a coach of the Indian Carrom team. He is from Thane, in Maharashtra. He has also coached the Maharashtra Carrom team.

As Player
As a player, he was a seven time state champion (a record since 1976) and a national champion. He is an Indian National champion in Singles, Doubles, Mixed doubles and veteran singles.

As Coach
He coached the Indian national Carrom team on several occasions, including the 1st and 3rd World Carrom Championship. He has written 2 books on Carrom: One for players and the other for coaches. He has produced two CDs namely, Carrom Technique and Carrom Treasure.  These contain huge knowledge, tips, tricks, and techniques on Carrom.

He also coached Pierre Dubois, the winner of Euro Open Carrom Tournament.

In 2006, the first Carrom Dron was presented to Arun Deshpande, when India won the Carrom World Cup.

He has coached players from India, Sri Lanka, Maldives, Switzerland, Germany, Italy, France, UK, and Spain.

As a Writer
He has written three books namely "Carrom Skill and Technique", "Players Guide" and "Coaches Guide".

He has produced four DVDs/VCDs "Carrom Technique", "Carrom Treasure"., "Amazing Strokes" and "Stress Release"

He has produced 4 vcds
1)Carrom Technique
2)Carrom Treasure
3) Amazing Strokes
4) Exhibition strokes for stress relief
He has Facebook page namely Arun Carrom
He has YouTube channel namely Arun Deshpande

He has developed a website 
carromcoaching.com
There are three levels of courses
1) Beginners - 12 videos
2) Intermediate - 25 videos
3) Champion - 32 videos

References
 https://web.archive.org/web/20080617235745/http://www.uscarrom.org/help/coach/ad.htm
 http://punjabcarrom.googlepages.com/arundeshpande
 http://pscamohali.googlepages.com/pierredubois

Living people
Indian carrom players
Game players from Maharashtra
Year of birth missing (living people)
Carrom coaches